Petr Ramseidl (born 20 August 1964) is a Czech bobsledder. He competed in the two man event at the 1992 Winter Olympics.

References

1964 births
Living people
Czech male bobsledders
Olympic bobsledders of Czechoslovakia
Bobsledders at the 1992 Winter Olympics
Place of birth missing (living people)